Ha-sun is a  Korean unisex name.

People with this name include:
Park Ha-sun (born 1987), South Korean actress

Fictional characters with this name include:
Ha-sun, in 2012 South Korean film Masquerade

See also
List of Korean given names

Korean unisex given names